Mulberry is a uranium alloy.

It is used as a non-corroding or 'stainless' uranium alloy. It has been put forward as a structural material for the casings of the physics package in nuclear weapons, including those of North Korea.

The composition is a ternary alloy, of 7.5% niobium, 2.5% zirconium, 90% uranium. 

Mulberry was developed in the 1960s at UCRL. Binary alloy compositions were first studied to avoid the mechanical problems of pure uranium: corrosion, dimensional instability, inability to improve its mechanical properties by heat treatment. Uranium-molybdenum alloys were found susceptible to stress-corrosion cracking, uranium-niobium alloys to be weak, and uranium-zirconium alloys to be brittle. Ternary alloys were next studied to try to avoid these drawbacks. Uranium-niobium-zirconium was found to be corrosion resistant and to permit age hardening, which could increase its hardness from 110 to 270 ksi.

Multiple crystal phases were observed, with a critical temperature of 650°C. Above this the body-centered cubic γ phase was stable. Water quenching to room temperature produces a γs transition phase and with aging this transforms to a tetragonal γo phase. Further aging produces a monoclinic ɑ phase that is observed metallographically as a Widmanstätten pattern. The crystal structure of the alloy has been studied, particularly the γ phase. Uranium inclusions have been observed within the alloy although, unlike the binary alloys, niobium-rich inclusions were not. Early studies were uncertain as to whether these were inherent behaviours, or artifacts of their processing.

References 

Uranium